Frederick Rudolf of Fürstenberg was a Count of Fürstenberg. He fought in the Thirty Years' War. He died near Datschitz in the modern-day Czech Republic.

References 

German princes
Fürstenberg (princely family)